Patrick Welsh may refer to:

Patrick Welsh (baseball), see Ohio State League
Patrick Welsh (gangster), see Arthur Thompson (gangster)
Patrick Welsh of Welsh, Carson, Anderson & Stowe
Patrick T. Welsh (1950–2007), American politician

See also
Pat Welsh (disambiguation)
Patrick Welch (disambiguation)
Patrick Walsh (disambiguation)